The Mount Carroll Historic District is a designated historic district in the Carroll County, Illinois town of Mount Carroll, which is the county seat.  The district is listed on the National Register of Historic Places (NRHP), and is one of a total six sites in the county included on the Register.

The district was added to the NRHP in 1980.  One building within the district, the Carroll County Courthouse, had already been added to the NRHP in 1973.

The District is divided into three major sections: the traditional downtown of Mount Carroll, including the courthouse, library and business district; a residential area to the south of the downtown; and further south, the historic original campus of Chicago's Shimer College, now occupied by the Campbell Center for Historic Preservation Studies.  The great majority of the buildings in the first two sections date from before 1900. Due to a fire that destroyed the original Mount Carroll Seminary campus in 1906, all of the Shimer campus buildings are from the 20th century, but most date from before 1930.

NRHP-listed structures that are located within Mount Carroll but not included in the district are the Caroline Mark House and Nathaniel Halderman House.

Buildings and structures

The District's boundaries include a total of 272 buildings and structures, of which 81 have been assessed to have particular architectural and historic significance.

Shimer College campus

The buildings of the erstwhile Shimer College campus are chiefly in the Georgian Revival style; they form a traditional college quadrangle.  Two buildings that formed part of the Shimer College campus, but were built after 1960, are omitted from the Historic District: these are the Karyn Kupcinet Playhouse and the New Men's Dorm, both of which are separated from the rest of the campus by Jackson Street.

Since Shimer's departure in 1978, the campus has been occupied by the Campbell Center for Historic Preservation Studies, originally known as the "Restoration College".  The buildings are used for administrative, classroom, and lodging purposes, but also serve as subject matter for the study and practice of historic preservation.

References

External links
Campbell Center for Historic Preservation Studies
Carroll County Historical Society

Historic districts on the National Register of Historic Places in Illinois
Geography of Carroll County, Illinois
Buildings and structures in Carroll County, Illinois
National Register of Historic Places in Carroll County, Illinois